The 2021 Princess Auto Players' Championship was held April 20–25, 2021 at the Markin MacPhail Centre at Canada Olympic Park in Calgary, Alberta.

Due to the COVID-19 pandemic in Canada, it was announced that both the Players' Championship and the Champions Cup Grand Slam of Curling events would still be held in the 2020–21 curling season but would move to a centralized "bubble" (similar to that of the NHL as in Edmonton) at Canada Olympic Park alongside Curling Canada's national championships. All events will be held behind closed doors with no spectators.

In the men's final, Team Bruce Mouat of Scotland won their second consecutive slam in the bubble, defeating Team Brad Gushue of St. John's 6–5. Team Mouat won the 2021 Champions Cup just six days prior to their win at the Players' Championship.

In the women's final, Team Kerri Einarson of Gimli topped Team Rachel Homan of Ottawa 5–2 to win their second consecutive Players' Championship title.

Qualification
The top 12 ranked men's and women's teams on the World Curling Federation's world team rankings qualified for the event. In the event that a team declines their invitation, the next-ranked team on the world team ranking is invited until the field is complete.

Men
Top world team ranking men's teams:
 Brad Jacobs
 John Epping
 Brad Gushue
 Brendan Bottcher
 Bruce Mouat
 Yannick Schwaller
 Mike McEwen
 Niklas Edin
 Peter de Cruz
 Kevin Koe
 Matt Dunstone
 Ross Paterson
 Jason Gunnlaugson

Women
Top world team ranking women's teams:
 Anna Hasselborg
 Kerri Einarson
 Tracy Fleury
 Satsuki Fujisawa
 Jennifer Jones
 Elena Stern
 Silvana Tirinzoni
 Rachel Homan
 Eve Muirhead
 Tabitha Peterson
 Kim Min-ji
 Alina Kovaleva

Men

Teams

The teams are listed as follows:

Round-robin standings
Final round-robin standings

Round-robin results
All draw times are listed in Mountain Daylight Time (UTC−06:00).

Draw 1
Tuesday, April 20, 1:00 pm

Draw 2
Tuesday, April 20, 4:30 pm

Draw 3
Tuesday, April 20, 8:00 pm

Draw 4
Wednesday, April 21, 8:00 am

Draw 6
Wednesday, April 21, 4:00 pm

Draw 7
Wednesday, April 21, 8:00 pm

Draw 8
Thursday, April 22, 8:00 am

Draw 9
Thursday, April 22, 12:00 pm

Draw 10
Thursday, April 22, 4:00 pm

Draw 11
Thursday, April 22, 8:00 pm

Draw 12
Friday, April 23, 8:00 am

Draw 13
Friday, April 23, 12:00 pm

Draw 15
Friday, April 23, 8:00 pm

Tiebreaker
Saturday, April 24, 12:00 pm

Playoffs

Quarterfinals
Saturday, April 24, 4:00 pm

Semifinals
Saturday, April 24, 8:00 pm

Final
Sunday, April 25, 2:00 pm

Women

Teams

The teams are listed as follows:

Round-robin standings
Final round-robin standings

Round-robin results
All draw times are listed in Mountain Daylight Time (UTC−06:00).

Draw 1
Tuesday, April 20, 1:00 pm

Draw 2
Tuesday, April 20, 4:30 pm

Draw 3
Tuesday, April 20, 8:00 pm

Draw 4
Wednesday, April 21, 8:00 am

Draw 5
Wednesday, April 21, 12:00 pm

Draw 6
Wednesday, April 21, 4:00 pm

Draw 7
Wednesday, April 21, 8:00 pm

Draw 8
Thursday, April 22, 8:00 am

Draw 9
Thursday, April 22, 12:00 pm

Draw 11
Thursday, April 22, 8:00 pm

Draw 12
Friday, April 23, 8:00 am

Draw 13
Friday, April 23, 12:00 pm

Draw 14
Friday, April 23, 4:00 pm

Playoffs

Quarterfinals
Saturday, April 24, 4:00 pm

Semifinals
Saturday, April 24, 8:00 pm

Final
Sunday, April 25, 9:30 am

Notes

References

External links

Players' Championship
Players' Championship
Players' Championship
Curling in Alberta
Sport in Calgary
Players Championship